The Bronko Nagurski Trophy has been awarded annually since 1993 to the collegiate American football defensive player adjudged by the membership of the Football Writers Association of America (FWAA) to be the best in the National Collegiate Athletic Association. The award is named for Bronko Nagurski, who played football for the University of Minnesota and Chicago Bears, and is presented by the Charlotte Touchdown Club and FWAA.

Winners

See also
 Chuck Bednarik Award, a similar award given by the Maxwell Football Club

References
General
 

Footnotes

External links
The Bronko Nagurski Charlotte Touchdown Club

College football national player awards
Awards established in 1993
1993 establishments in the United States